McKinnis is a surname. Notable people with the surname include:

Bo McKinnis, American sports agent
Hugh McKinnis (born 1946), American football player and Canadian football player
Simone McKinnis (born 1966), Australian netball coach

See also
McKinnis Peak, a mountain of Antarctica